Stenoma conveniens is a moth of the family Depressariidae. It is found in Amazonas, Brazil.

The wingspan is about 14 mm. The forewings are whitish ochreous, all veins marked brownish-ochreous lines, these not reaching the margin but connected by a curved pre-terminal shade, on the lower angle of the cell a slight thickening of dark fuscous suffusion. There is a marginal series of black dots around the apical part of the costa and termen. The hindwings are light grey.

References

Moths described in 1925
Taxa named by Edward Meyrick
Stenoma